Heinrich Fasching (24 May 1929 – 1 June 2014) was a Roman Catholic bishop.

Ordained to the priesthood in 1954, Fasching was named titular bishop of Acci and auxiliary bishop of the Roman Catholic Diocese of Sankt Pölten in 1993. He retired in 2004.

Notes

1929 births
2014 deaths
Roman Catholic bishops of Sankt Pölten
20th-century Roman Catholic titular bishops
21st-century Roman Catholic titular bishops
20th-century Roman Catholic bishops in Austria
21st-century Roman Catholic bishops in Austria